Reyes v R is a 2002 Judicial Committee of the Privy Council (JCPC) case in which it was held that it was unconstitutional in Belize for capital punishment to be the mandatory sentence for murder. The JCPC held that because the Constitution of Belize prohibits "inhuman or degrading punishment", following a murder conviction, a trial judge must have discretion to impose a lesser penalty than death by hanging; capital punishment may be applied only in those cases that contain aggravating factors as compared to other murder cases.

The case was decided with R v Hughes and Fox v R, cases on the same issue on appeal from Saint Lucia and Saint Kitts and Nevis.

See also
Bowe v R
Boyce v R
Matthew v S

External links
Reyes v R, bailii.org

2002 in case law
2002 in Belize
Death penalty case law
Judicial Committee of the Privy Council cases on appeal from Belize
Prisoners sentenced to death by Belize
Murder in Belize
Human rights in Belize